is a kart racing video game developed and published by Nintendo for the Nintendo 64. The game is the second main entry in the Mario Kart series and is the successor to Super Mario Kart (1992) for the Super Nintendo Entertainment System. The game was released in Japan on December 14, 1996; in North America on February 10, 1997; and in the United Kingdom on June 24, 1997. It was released for the iQue Player in China in 2003. It was released on the Wii and Wii U Virtual Console in 2007 and 2016, and on the Nintendo Switch Online + Expansion Pack on October 25, 2021.

Changes from the original include the move to polygon-based true 3D computer graphics for track design, and the inclusion of four-player support. Players take control of one of eight characters from the Mario franchise, who race around 16 tracks (4 in each of 4 cups) with items that can either harm opponents or aid the user. The move to three-dimensional graphics allowed for track features not possible with the original game's Mode 7 graphics, such as changes in elevation, bridges, walls, and pits. However, the characters and items remain 2D pre-rendered sprites. The game was commercially successful and was generally praised for the fun and high replay value of its multiplayer modes. The game is regarded as one of the greatest video games of all time.

Gameplay 

Mario Kart 64 is a kart racing game in which the player controls one of eight selectable Mario characters in several racetracks that vary in shape and theme. During a race, the players can obtain random items from special boxes placed in different areas of the track that are used to impede the opposition and gain the advantage. For example, Koopa Troopa shells and bananas allow the player to attack opponents and slow them down, and Mushrooms grant the player a temporary boost in speed and jumping ability. In a change from the previous installment, players can carry more than one item at a time. Mario Kart 64 has 16 racecourses and 4 battle courses. It is the first game in the Mario Kart series that supports slipstreaming.

Game modes 
There are four different game modes available in Mario Kart 64: Grand Prix, Time Trial, Versus, and Battle. Grand Prix mode supports both single-player and competitive multiplayer gameplay, while other modes only support one or the other.
 Grand Prix – This mode has one or two players participate in four consecutive three-lap races, each on a different course, on one of the four selectable cups (Mushroom, Flower, Star, or Special) against seven (or six) computer players. When the player completes a race, points are awarded based on the rank they finished ranging from one to eight and the placement order gets carried over to the next race as the new starting lineup. If the player ranks 5th or under, the player must restart the race. Unlike the original Super Mario Kart, the player can restart an unlimited number of times, instead of only being allowed three restarts. After finishing all four races, trophies are awarded to the players who scored the highest accumulation of points: bronze for third place, silver for second, and gold for first. Difficulty level is measured by engine size: 50, 100, or 150cc. There is an additional unlockable difficulty called "Extra", which allows players to race at speed 100cc on tracks that are inverted left-to-right. This is the first game in the series to provide this feature. Later installments call this feature "Mirror Mode" or "150cc Mirror Mode".
 Time Trial – This is a single-player-only mode where the objective is to complete a three-lap race on the selected track in the fastest total time possible. There are no opponent racers or item boxes, though the player will always begin each race with a Triple Mushroom in reserve. For any given course, the top five fastest total times are saved, and the fastest single lap time of any race is also saved. The player can select to race against a ghost character, who will mimic the movement of the player from a previous race. Ghost data for up to two different courses can be saved permanently only on a Controller Pak device. However, the Virtual Console version of Mario Kart 64 released on the Wii is incompatible with the device and is thus unable to save ghost data.
 Versus – Two to four players compete in single races on any track without any computer players. With two players, the total number of wins for each player is tracked, and in three- or four-player matches, the number of 1st, 2nd, and 3rd place wins is tracked for each racer.
 Battle – This mode, supporting two to four players, has a last man standing objective where the players attack each other with items inside one of four selectable arena courses. The players begin a match with three balloons attached to each of their karts. A player will lose one balloon each time their character is damaged by coming into contact with one of the other players' offending items, and is eliminated from play upon losing all balloons. The match ends when one player remains, who is then declared the winner. In three- or four-player matches, the first two players' characters to lose all their balloons will transform into mobile "Mini Bomb Karts" and forfeit the ability to win the match. The Mini Bomb Kart is still maneuverable by the player and can collide and inflict damage on another player only once, after which it can no longer participate.
The racetrack map with players' locations can be viewed as a miniature map, rectangular progress bar ("Rank Data"), or a speedometer can be shown instead. On Yoshi's Valley, the rectangular progress bar does not identify characters due to the vagueness of the course's paths.

Playable characters 
Mario Kart 64 features eight playable characters: Mario, Luigi, Princess Peach, Toad, Yoshi, Bowser, Wario and Donkey Kong. The characters are divided into three weight classes: lightweights, whose karts have the highest acceleration and top speed in trade for low weight; heavyweights, whose karts have higher weight to knock around players and lose less speed while turning, but suffer from slightly lower top speed and acceleration; and middleweights, who have mediocre acceleration and the same top speed as the heavyweights, but have much better control of steering. The game was originally to feature the character Kamek, a villainous character from Yoshi's Island, before being replaced by Donkey Kong.

Development 
Production began in 1995 with the title Super Mario Kart R, where the "R" means "rendered". The game was developed concurrently with Super Mario 64 and The Legend of Zelda: Ocarina of Time, intended to be a launch game for the Nintendo 64 (N64), but more resources were given to the other two. Mario series creator Shigeru Miyamoto acted as producer and often consulted with game director Hideki Konno. Some early footage of the game was showcased briefly at the Shoshinkai Software Exhibition in Japan on 24 November 1995. Miyamoto stated that the game was 95% complete, but Nintendo chose not to display a playable version due to the difficult logistics of demonstrating the multiplayer features. The prototype featured the Feather item from Super Mario Kart and a Magikoopa as one of the eight playable characters, who was replaced with Donkey Kong in the final game.

The player's driving controls were designed to be similar to operating a radio-controlled car. Mario Kart 64 features tracks that are fully rendered in 3D, and billboarding to display the characters and items through the use of Advanced Character Modeling (ACM), the MIPS CPU, and Silicon Graphics workstations. Konno stated that, though rendering the characters as 3D models was not impossible, the display of eight simultaneous 3D characters would have exceeded the processing power of the console. Instead, the characters are composed of pre-rendered sprites that show the characters from various angles to simulate a 3D appearance, similar to Super Mario Kart, Killer Instinct, and Cruis'n USA. Rare, developer of the Donkey Kong Country games, provided Donkey Kong's character model. Halfway into the game's production, the developers suffered a hard disk crash, causing the original character models to become lost. They were forced to remake "about 80%" of the character models, and updated the character select screen to have them animated instead of still, which was not in the original plans.

The technique of rubber band AI prevents all the racers from easily separating, and the Spiny Shell item, which targets and attacks the player in first place, was added in order to keep each race competitive and balanced. The item was included in all subsequent Mario Kart games.

Soundtrack 
The soundtrack for Mario Kart 64 was composed by Kenta Nagata, which is his first work on a Nintendo game. The soundtrack was released several times in different formats including compact disc and audio cassette. Four different versions of the album were released: Race Tracks and Greatest Hits Soundtrack in North America; Original Soundtrack and Club Circuit were released in Japan. It was later released in a three disc collection, along with the soundtracks of Star Fox 64 and Super Mario 64.

Release 
In addition to the regular release in Japan, Nintendo released a "limited edition" which was the regular cartridge bundled with a black-and-grey Nintendo 64 controller. The Japanese release in December 1996 was followed by a U.S. release in February 1997. Nintendo of America chairman Howard Lincoln stated that in addition to the time needed for the localization, Mario Kart 64 was more critical to the Japanese market, as there were fewer N64 games available in that market at the time. It was released in the United Kingdom on June 24, 1997.

Mario Kart 64 was released as a downloadable Virtual Console game on the Wii in January 2007 and on the Wii U in December 2016. In October 2021, Nintendo also ported the game to Nintendo Switch Online.

During the first three months of 1997, Mario Kart 64 was the best-selling console game in the United States, with sales of 849,000 units for the period. By 2007, approximately 5.5 million copies of Mario Kart 64 had been sold in the United States and 2.24 million in Japan.

Reception 

Mario Kart 64 received generally positive reviews from critics and proved to be a commercial success. Review aggregator Metacritic ranks it as the sixth-highest ranked Nintendo 64 title based on fifteen reviews. It has sold 9.87 million copies worldwide, making it the second-best-selling game on N64.

Critics debated the game's presentation and visuals. Supporters felt the game adequately used the power of the N64 (critics from GamePro and Electronic Gaming Monthly), made the game stand out from others in the racing genre and in the Mario series (GameSpot's Trent Ward), and was an improvement over its 16-bit predecessor (NintendoLife's Corbie Dillard and a reviewer from GameRevolution). Carine Barrel from the French Officiel Nintendo Magazine enjoyed the game's colourful and fluid visuals, adding that its overall presentation likened a "magical" experience. Detractors of the graphics felt they lacked detail (Tom Gulse from Computer and Video Games and Peer Schneider from IGN), weren't better enough than the previous 16-bit entry (AllGame's Scott McCall and Neil West from Next Generation), and failed to fully benefit from the N64's power (Francois Caron of Jeuxvideo.com). The use of 2D sprites was a common critique, West arguing that it made the game look 16-bit.

Mario Kart 64s track design and gameplay polarised critics. The game was panned for being un-innovative (Schneider), too easy (Caron), and simple and monotonous (Ward and Nick Ferguson from Edge). Computer and Video Gamess Ed Lomas and N64 Magazines Jonathan Nash felt that success was too dependent on getting the right power-ups. Morley disliked Mario Kart 64s wide, motorway-like track design by saying that it did not provide an "adrenaline filled" experience which players might have hoped for. Critics also found fault in the game's use of rubberband difficulty balancing, recognising that it gave the enemy AI an unfair advantage. Technical issues such as poor collision detection and lag in the four-player "Battle Mode" were also noted.

The gameplay did have supporters, who noted its large amount of courses (West, GamePro, and Electric Playground), found its track designs more detailed and impressive than Super Mario Kart (Schneider and Diillard), and thought it had a lot of replay value (Caron and GamePro). Hypers David Wildgoose and Jonathan highlighted the flexible turning control with the multiple-angled joystick, calling it "perfect" and true to real-life karts. Jonathan enjoyed the amount of focus and fast reflexes required for the player. Wildgoose reported having many unexpected moments while playing the game due to its "ingeniously fiendish AI" and the boxes containing different power-ups each time they're collected. Reviewers, even those lukewarm towards the graphics, positively noted touches such as the 180-degree turns in Bowser's Castle, the train tracks on Kalimari Desert, the trucks in Toad's Turnpike, the cows in Moo Moo Farm, Peach's castle on Royal Raceway, and the sliding penguins in Sherbet Land as highlights, as well as smoke puffs coming out of the kart. Critics found the multiplayer mode to be better than the single player, with Schneider calling it "multi-player mayhem at its best". Electronic Gaming Monthly named it a runner-up for "Multiplayer Game of the Year" (behind Saturn Bomberman) at their 1997 Editors' Choice Awards.

The game was commercially popular and helped spawn several sequels which have been brought out across generations of Nintendo consoles. Mario Kart 64 placed 17th in Official Nintendo Magazines 100 greatest Nintendo games of all time and 49th in Electronic Gaming Monthlys 1997 list of the 100 best console games of all time.

References

Citations

Bibliography

Notes

External links 
 Official Japanese website

1996 video games
IQue games
64
Mario racing games
Nintendo 64 games
Nintendo Entertainment Analysis and Development games
Video games developed in Japan
Virtual Console games for Wii
Video games with pre-rendered 3D graphics
Virtual Console games for Wii U
Nintendo Switch Online games
Multiplayer and single-player video games